Vallonia costata is a species of small air-breathing land snail, a terrestrial pulmonate gastropod mollusk in the family Valloniidae.

Description
For terms, see gastropod shell

The 1.1-1.6 x 2.2-2.7 mm shell has 3.2-3.3 whorls. Whorls are slightly angular at the periphery with deep sutures. The shell is flat with regular and widely spaced ribs. The shell is striated between the ribs, the last whorl is descending. The almost circular aperture is oblique (inclined downwards) and in adult specimens broadly reflected. The lip is thickened and reflected. As in other Vallonia, the umbilicus is very wide. The shell is ivory-white. For differences from Vallonia pulchella see that species.

Distribution
This species occurs in countries and islands including:
 Great Britain
 Ireland
 Czech Republic
 Slovakia
 Poland
 Netherlands
 Latvia
 Ukraine
 and other areas

References

 Spencer, H.G., Marshall, B.A. & Willan, R.C. (2009). Checklist of New Zealand living Mollusca. pp 196–219 in Gordon, D.P. (ed.) New Zealand inventory of biodiversity. Volume one. Kingdom Animalia: Radiata, Lophotrochozoa, Deuterostomia. Canterbury University Press, Christchurch.
 Herbert, D.G. (2010). The introduced terrestrial Mollusca of South Africa. SANBI Biodiversity Series, 15: vi + 108 pp. Pretoria.
 Kerney, M.P., Cameron, R.A.D. & Jungbluth, J-H. (1983). Die Landschnecken Nord- und Mitteleuropas. Ein Bestimmungsbuch für Biologen und Naturfreunde, 384 pp., 24 plates. 
 Sysoev, A. V. & Schileyko, A. A. (2009). Land snails and slugs of Russia and adjacent countries. Sofia/Moskva (Pensoft). 312 pp., 142 plates.
 Minato, H. (1988). A systematic and bibliographic list of the Japanese land snails. H. Minato, Shirahama, 294 pp., 7 pls
 Ramakrishna, Mitra, S, C. & Dey, A. (2010). Annotated checklist of Indian land molluscs. Zoological Survey of India, Kolkata, 359 pp.
 National Institute of Biological Resources. (2019). National Speices list of Korea. II. Vertebrates, Invertebrates, Protozoans. Designzip. 908 pp.

External links
Vallonia costata at Animalbase taxonomy,short description, distribution, biology,status (threats), images
 Risso A. (1826). Histoire naturelle des principales productions de l'Europe méridionale et particulièrement de celles des environs de Nice et des Alpes Maritimes, vol. 4. Paris: Levrault. vii + 439 pp., pls 1-12
 Jooss, C.H. (1912). Neue Landschnecken aus dem Obermiocän von Steinheim am Aalbuch in Württemberg. Nachrichtsblatt der Deutschen Malakozoologischen Gesellschaft. 44(1): 30-45
 Müller, O. F. (1774). Vermium terrestrium et fluviatilium, seu animalium infusorium, Helminthicorum, et testaceorum, non marinorum, succincta historia. vol 2: I-XXXVI, 1-214, 10 unnumbered pages. Havniae et Lipsiae, apud Heineck et Faber, ex officina Molleriana.
 Sandberger, C.L.F. (1870-1875). Die Land- und Süßwasser-Conchylien der Vorwelt. C. W. Kreidel, Wiesbaden. 
 Vallonia costata (Müll.) (Gastropoda Pulmonata) in South Africa, with additional notes on other alien species. Basteria. 61: 85-57. Leiden
 Sterki, V. (1905). November snails. The Nautilus. 19(8): 96

Valloniidae
Gastropods described in 1774
Taxa named by Otto Friedrich Müller